Sirru is a Maldivian romantic drama web series directed by Mohamed Aboobakuru. Produced by ME Productions, it stars Ahmed Asim, Hawwa Shadhiya, Aminath Shuha and Ahmed Shareef in main roles. Filming for the five episodes' series commenced in June 2021. The pilot episode of the series was released on 21 October 2021.

Cast and characters
 Ahmed Asim as Amir
 Hawwa Shadhiya as Reema
 Aminath Shuha as Asma
 Ahmed Emau as Nadheem
 Ahmed Shareef

Episodes

Soundtrack

Release and reception
The first episode of the series was released on 21 October 2021. Reviewing the first two episodes of the series, Ahmed Rasheed from MuniAvas was generally in favor of the screenplay and wrote: "The series narrates a common and relatable storyline from a different perspective". The series was ranked fifth position at Baiskoafu Original Chart revealed on 3 December 2021.

References

Serial drama television series
Maldivian television shows
Maldivian web series